Longvic is a commune in the Côte-d'Or department in eastern France.

Population

Personalities
Rangers F.C. and Algeria defender Madjid Bougherra was born here.

See also
Communes of the Côte-d'Or department

References

Communes of Côte-d'Or